Guinea-Bissau has sent athletes to every Summer Olympic Games held since 1996, although the country has never won an Olympic medal.  No athletes from Guinea-Bissau have competed in any Winter Olympic Games.

The National Olympic Committee was created in 1992 and recognized by the International Olympic Committee in 1995.

Medal tables

Medals by Summer Games

See also
 List of flag bearers for Guinea-Bissau at the Olympics
 List of participating nations at the Summer Olympic Games
 List of participating nations at the Winter Olympic Games

External links
 
 
 

 
Olympics